The Albatros class  was a class of eight corvettes designed and built in Italy in the 1950s. Paid for by US funds, they were operated by Italy, Denmark, Indonesia and the Netherlands. The last ships of the class were retired from service in Italy in 1991.

Design
In the early 1950s, the Italian shipyard Ansaldo designed a class of corvettes suitable for coastal escort duties. The design was selected for production in Italian shipyards for NATO navies using US funds under the Mutual Defense Assistance Program, with three ships built for Italy, four for Denmark and one for the Netherlands.

As built, the ships were armed with two  SMP 3 automatic cannon, with single turrets, one forward and one aft, and a single twin 40 mm Bofors mount. Anti-submarine armament consisted of two Hedgehog forward with depth charge projectors and racks aft.

History
The lead ship in the class, Albatros, was completed in 1955, with deliveries continuing until 1957, when the last ship, Bellona, delivered to Denmark in 1957.

The Netherlands found Lynx to be unsuitable, and it was transferred to Italy in 1961, where it was renamed Aquila. In service, the SMP 3 guns proved to be a failure, being too complex and unreliable, (Lynx suffered an explosion in one of its SMP 3 guns during its brief service with the Netherlands Navy) and adversely affecting the ships' seaworthiness. As a result, Italy re-armed its ships in 1963, replacing the 76 mm guns with single 40 mm Bofors guns. Danish ships used U.S. pattern 3-inch guns which were retained for the entire ships service lives.

The Danish ship Diana was discarded in 1974, with Flora being stricken in 1978. The final two Danish ships, Bellona and Triton were discarded in 1981 as they were replaced by the s. In 1961, Flora took part in the filming of the giant-monster movie Reptilicus, which became a legend of cheesy cinema and would eventually become an episode of Mystery Science Theater 3000 in 2017.

The Italian ships' anti-submarine armament was improved by replacing the depth charge launchers with two triple torpedo tubes for  anti-submarine torpedoes. Albatros and Alcione were equipped for minesweeping, being fitted with paravanes and equipment davits at the expense of the torpedo tubes, although they retained their designation as corvettes

It had been intended to discard the Italian ships in 1982–83, but they were kept in service to meet a continuing need for coastal patrol vessels. Albatros was the first Italian ship to be discarded, being decommissioned in 1985, but used as an accommodation hulk until stricken in April 1989. The remaining three ships were discarded in 1991.

Ships in class

Citations

References
 Blackman, Raymond V. B. Jane's Fighting Ships 1960–61. London: Sampson Low, Marston & Company, 1962.
 Blackman, Raymond V. B. Jane's Fighting Ships 1971–72. London: Sampson Low, Marston & Company, 1971. .
 Couhat, Jean Labayle and A.D. Baker III. Combat Fleets of the World 1986/87. Annapolis, Maryland, USA: Naval Institute Press, 1986. .
 Gardiner, Robert and Stephen Chumbley. Conway's All The World's Fighting Ships 1947–1995. Annapolis, Maryland, USA: Naval Institute Press, 1995. .
 Grove, Eric J. NATO Major Warships - Europe. London: Tri-Service Press, 1990. .
 Prézelin, Bernard and A.D. Baker III. Combat Fleets of the World 1990/1991. Annapolis, Maryland, USA: Naval Institute Press, 1990. .

External links

 Historical Ships Marina Militare website

Corvette classes
Corvettes of the Italian Navy
Corvettes of the Royal Netherlands Navy
Corvettes of the Royal Danish Navy
Corvettes of the Indonesian Navy